Crawford Dam (National ID # CO00556) impounds water for Crawford Reservoir in Delta County, Colorado about a mile south of the town of Crawford.

The earthen dam was completed in 1962 by the United States Bureau of Reclamation with a height of 162 feet and 580 feet long at its crest.  It impounds Iron Creek for irrigation flood control, one element of the Smith Fork Project.  The dam is owned by the Bureau and operated by the local Crawford Water Conservancy District. When full, Crawford Reservoir has a water surface area of 406 acres, about seven miles of shoreline, and a total capacity of 14,395 acre-feet.  The main purpose of the facility is to provide farm irrigation, and the size of Crawford Reservoir changes significantly with the seasons. In most years, the lake is full in late Spring and early Summer, but by early Fall, the water level drops enough to leave boat launches high and dry. The low water pool lasts through the Winter until Spring runoff begins to fill the water supply once again. 
The reservoir is encompassed within Crawford State Park with Park Headquarters located on a peninsula along the northeastern shore. Recreation opportunities include fishing (for yellow perch, northern pike, black crappie, largemouth bass, trout, channel catfish, etc.), boating, camping on 66 campsites, picnicking, swimming, and hiking.

References 

Dams in Colorado
Reservoirs in Colorado
United States Bureau of Reclamation dams
Buildings and structures in Delta County, Colorado
Earth-filled dams
Dams completed in 1962
Bodies of water of Delta County, Colorado